The Barry Creyton Show is an Australian television talk show series that aired in 1967, and was presented by its namesake Barry Creyton, star of The Mavis Bramston Show on airing on what would eventually become the Seven Network. Featured stars where Terry Norris and Vi Greenhalf. 
 
The half-hour daytime series was produced by Richard Gray of NLT Productions, and was taped in Melbourne. It debuted 10 July 1967, and ended on 3 November 1967.

References

External links
The Barry Creyton Show on IMDb

1967 Australian television series debuts
1967 Australian television series endings
Black-and-white Australian television shows
English-language television shows
Australian television talk shows
Seven Network original programming